Uskoplje may refer to:

 Gornji Vakuf-Uskoplje, town in Bosnia and Herzegovina
 Uskoplje, Ravno, village near Trebinje, Bosnia and Herzegovina
 Uskoplje, Croatia, village in Konavle, Croatia